Francesco Giuffrè (born March 25, 1972) is the son of Italian actor Carlo Giuffrè. He is a composer, film dubber, screenwriter and theatre director.

Theatre director  

2006 "Il Profumo" by Patrick Süskind, Teatro Argot in Rome. 
2007 "Cuore di cane" by Mikhail Bulgakov, Teatro Argot in Rome 
2008 "Othellow" by William Shakespeare, Teatro Argot, in Rome 
2010 "Hell - un'altra storia del moro di Venezia", inspired by William Shakespeare, Teatro Piccolo Eliseo, in Rome , original music by Andrea Amendola
2010 "Crime and Punishment, by Fyodor Dostoyevsky, Teatro Argot in Rome. , original music composed by Gianluca Attanasio
2011 "Crime and Punishment", by Fyodor Dostoyevsky. Teatro Argot in Rome. Original music composed by Gianluca Attanasio

Music for  Theatre 

2007 "Il medico dei pazzi by "Eduardo Scarpetta, directed by Carlo Giuffrè. Teatro Eliseo, in Rome 
2009 "Il sindaco del rione Sanità", by Eduardo De Filippo, directed by Carlo Giuffrè. Teatro Manzoni, Milan
2010 "I casi sono due", by Armando Curcio directed by Carlo Guffrè. Teatro Quirino, Rome "

References 
 Profumo
, "Hell", review
, "Hell" review
, review
 interview on "Mondoteatro"
 review on Teatro Eliseo
 "Cuore di cane" on "Aprirte il sipario" magazine
 "Hell" on info.roma

External links 
 "Cuore di cane" official blog

Living people
1972 births